Calvert may refer to:

People
 Calvert (name), about the name, including a list of people who bear it
 Calvert family, an English noble family

Places

Australia 
 Calvert Range, Western Australia
 Calvert River, Northern Territory

Canada 
 Calvert, Newfoundland and Labrador
 Calvert Island, Ontario
 Calvert Island (British Columbia)

United Kingdom 
 Calvert, Buckinghamshire, England
 Calvert railway station
 Calverton, Nottinghamshire, England

United States 
 Calvert, Alabama
 Calvert, Kansas
 Calvert, Maryland
 Calvert, Texas
 Calvert City, Kentucky (also formerly known as Calvert)
 Calvert County, Maryland
 Calvert Cliffs Nuclear Power Plant
 Calvert Cliffs State Park
 Calvert Street (disambiguation)

Schools
 Calvert School (disambiguation)
 Calvert Hall College High School

Other
 Calvert expedition, 1896 exploring expedition in north-central Western Australia
 Calvert Extra, an American brand of blended whiskey 
 Calvert Investments, an investment management company
 Calvert Marine Museum
 USS Calvert, ship